Erbil Governorate is a governorate in the Kurdistan Region. It is the capital and economic hub of the autonomous region of Kurdistan.

Government
Omid Khoshnaw, governor of Erbil

Districts

Cities and towns

Erbil, population 1,500,000
Rewanduz, population 95,089
Beni Silawey Gewre, population 37,322
Kune Gurg, population 30,283
Selaheddin, population 18,205
Mexmur, population 18,128
Koya Senjaq, population 15,123
Kasnazan, population 12,783
Derbend, population 10,086
Shaweis, population 7,387
Behirke, population 6,758
Piran, population 6,715
Qasre, population 5,472

Academic establishments
Salahaddin University: Founded in 1958 in Sulaymaniya and transferred to Erbil in 1981.
Hawler Medical University: Founded in 2005.
University of Kurdistan Hewlêr: Public English-medium university.
Tishk International University (Previously called Ishik University): Private university that was established in 2008 in Erbil.
Cihan University: Private university, founded in 2007.
SABIS University: Private university.
Soran University, KRG-Iraq governmental university founded in 2009.
Knowledge University, KRG-Iraq Private university founded in 2009.
Catholic University in Erbil, Private non-profit university founded in 2015.

Banking

There are many national and international banks operating in Erbil offering citizens and visitors services, including:
Kurdistan Central Bank
Kurdistan International Bank for Investment and Development
Trade Bank of Iraq (TBI) 
Byblos Bank
Bank of Beirut and Arab Countries (BBAC) 
Intercontinental Bank of Lebanon (IBL) 
BLOM Bank

See also
 The archaeological hills in Erbil
 Shanidar Cave

References

External links
largest cities and towns and statistics of their population in Arbil
Iraq Inter-Agency Information & Analysis Unit Reports, Maps and Assessments of Iraq's Governorates from the UN Inter-Agency Information & Analysis Unit

 
Governorates of Iraq
Geography of Iraqi Kurdistan
Upper Mesopotamia
Governorates of Kurdistan Region (Iraq)